Silicon Wadi is a region in Israel that serves as one of the global centres for advanced technology. It spans the Israeli coastal plain, and is cited as among the reasons why the country has become known as the world's "start-up nation" (see science and technology in Israel). The highest concentrations of high-tech industry in the region can be found around Tel Aviv, including small clusters around the cities of Raʽanana, Petah Tikva, Herzliya, Netanya, Rehovot, and Ness Ziona. Additional clusters of high-tech industry can be found in Haifa and Caesarea. More recent high-tech establishments have been raised in cities such as Jerusalem and Beersheba, in towns such as Yokneam Illit, and in Airport City.

Etymology 
The term "Silicon Wadi" is a pun-name derived from a similarly high-tech region in the United States known as Silicon Valley, which is located in California. The word "wadi" derives from the Arabic "واد", meaning 'valley'.

History
Israeli high-tech firms originally began to form in the 1960s. In 1961 ECI Telecom was founded, followed in 1962 by Tadiran and Elron Electronic Industries regarded by many to be the "Fairchild of Israel." The number of internationally successful firms grew slowly, with only one or two new successful firms each year until the early 1990s. Motorola was the first U.S. corporation to set up an R&D unit in Israel, in 1964. The center initially developed wireless products including remote irrigation systems and later developed leading chips such as the 68030. Following the 1967 French arms embargo, Israel was forced to develop a domestic military industry, focusing on developing a technological edge over its neighbors. Some of these military firms started to seek and develop civilian applications of military technology. In the 1970s more commercial innovations began, many of which were based on military R&D, including: Scitex digital printing systems, which were based on fast rotation drums from fast-rotation electronic warfare systems, and Elscint, which developed innovative medical imaging and became a leading force in its market.

High-tech firms continued to struggle throughout this period with marketing and many products, such as a mini-computer developed in the 1970s by Elbit, who were unable to successfully commercialise the product.

World software market takes off
Slowly, the international computing industry shifted the emphasis from hardware (in which Israel had no comparative advantage) to software products (in which human capital plays a larger role). The country became one of the first nations to compete in global software markets. By the 1980s a diverse set of software firms had developed. Each found niches which were not dominated by U.S. firms and between 1984 and 1991 "pure" software exports increased from $5 million to $110 million. Many of the important ideas here were developed by graduates of Mamram, the Israeli computer corps, established by the IDF in the 1960s.

During the 1980s and early 1990s several successful software companies emerged from Israel, including: Amdocs (established in 1982 as Aurec Information), Cimatron (established in 1982), Magic Software Enterprises (established in 1983), Comverse (established in 1983 as Efrat Future Technologies), Aladdin Knowledge Systems (established in 1985), NICE Systems  (established in 1986), Mercury Interactive (established in 1989) and Check Point Software Technologies (established in 1993).

The 1990s saw the real takeoff of high-tech industries in Israel, with international media attention increasing awareness of innovation in the country. Growth increased, whilst new immigrants from the Soviet Union increased the available high-tech workforce. Peace agreements including the 1993 Oslo Peace Accord increased the investment environment and Silicon Wadi began to develop into a noticeable high-tech cluster.

Dot-com boom
In 1998, Mirabilis, an Israeli company that developed the ICQ instant messaging program, which revolutionized communication over the Internet, was purchased by America Online (AOL) for $407 million in cash, 18 months after it was founded and having no revenues. The free service attracted a user base of 15 million in that period and by 2001, ICQ had over 100 million users worldwide.

The success of Mirabilis triggered the dot-com boom in Israel; thousands of start-up companies were established between 1998 and 2001, while venture capital raised by Israeli companies reached $1,851 million in 1999, peaking at $3,701 million in 2000. Over fifty Israeli companies had initial public offerings on NASDAQ and other international stock markets during that period.

Silicon Wadi today
For more than 50 years, local demand fueled Israeli industrial expansion, as the country's population grew rapidly and the standard of living rose. More recently, world demand for Israeli advanced technologies, software, electronics, and other sophisticated equipment has stimulated industrial growth. Israel's high status in new technologies is the result of its emphasis on higher education and research and development. Cultural factors contributing to the expansion include chutzpah and openness to immigration.  The government also assists industrial growth by providing low-rate loans from its development budget. The main limitations experienced by industry are the scarcity of domestic raw materials and sources of energy and the restricted size of the local market. One certain advantage is that many Israeli university graduates are likely to become IT entrepreneurs or join startups, about twice as much as U.S. university graduates, who are also attracted to traditional corporate executive positions, according to Charles A. Holloway, co-director of the Center for Entrepreneurial Studies and a professor at the Stanford Graduate School of Business of Stanford University. ICQ, for instance, is one of the world's most famous Israeli software products, developed by 4 young entrepreneurs. IBM has its IBM Content Discovery Engineering Team in Jerusalem, which is part of a number of IBM R&D Labs in Israel.

RAD Group's prominence
According to research conducted by Prof. Shmuel Ellis, Chair of the Management Department at Tel Aviv University's Faculty of Management, together with Prof. Israel Drori of the School of Business Administration at the College of Management and Prof. Zur Shapira, Chair of the Management and Organizations Department at New York University, the RAD Group, founded in 1981 by brothers Yehuda and Zohar Zisapel, has been "the most fertile ground" for creating Israeli entrepreneurs, having produced 56 "serial entrepreneurs" who established more than one start-up each. RAD Group "graduates" were responsible for the establishment of a total of 111 significant high-tech initiatives.

Location

Due to the small size of Israel, the concentration of high-tech firms across much of the country is enough for it to be recognised as one large cluster. Most activity is located in the densely populated areas of metropolitan Tel Aviv, Haifa (Matam), and Jerusalem (Technology Park, Malha, Har Hotzvim and JVP Media Quarter in Talpiot), and the Startup Village Ecosystem in the Yokneam area, although some secondary with additional activity include the corridor to Beer Sheba, including Kiryat Gat, and the Western Galilee. In all, this is an area no larger than 6000 square kilometers, half of the extended Silicon Valley's geographical coverage.

Economy
Many international technology companies have research and development facilities in this region, including companies such as Intel, IBM, Google, Facebook, Hewlett-Packard, Philips, Cisco Systems, Oracle Corporation, SAP, BMC Software, Microsoft, Motorola and CA. Many Israeli high-tech companies are based in the region, including Zoran Corporation, CEVA, Inc., Aladdin Knowledge Systems, Mellanox, NICE Systems, Horizon Semiconductors, RAD Data Communications, RADWIN, Radware, Tadiran Telecom, Radvision, Check Point Software Technologies, Amdocs, Babylon Ltd., Elbit, Israel Aerospace Industries and the solar thermal equipment designer and manufacturer Solel, with most of them being listed on the NASDAQ, which even has an Israel Index. Intel developed its dual-core Core Duo processor at its Israel Development Center located at the Merkaz Ta'asiya ve'Meida (Matam – Scientific Industries Center) in the city of Haifa. In 2006, more than 3,000 start-ups were created in Israel, a number that is only second to the U.S. Newsweek Magazine has also named Tel Aviv as one of the world's top ten "Hot High-Tech Cities". In 1998, Tel Aviv was named by Newsweek as one of the ten technologically most influential cities in the world. In 2012, the city was also named one of the best places for high-tech startup companies, placed only second behind its California counterpart.

Importance
The importance of Silicon Wadi was first recognised internationally by Wired magazine, who in 2000, ranked locations by the strength of cluster effects, giving the Israeli high-tech cluster the same rank as Boston, Helsinki, London, and Kista in Sweden, second only to Silicon Valley.

Sectors
 A cluster of software companies, who are monetizing "free" software downloads by adware or altering user's systems, has been dubbed Download Valley.

Israeli venture capital industry

The origins of the now thriving venture capital industry in Israel can be traced to a government initiative in 1993 named the Yozma program ("Initiative" in Hebrew); which offered attractive tax incentives to any foreign venture-capital investments in Israel and offered to double any investment with funds from the government. As a result, Between 1991 and 2000, Israel's annual venture-capital outlays, nearly all private, rose nearly 60-fold, from $58 million to $3.3 billion; companies launched by Israeli venture funds rose from 100 to 800; and Israel's information-technology revenues rose from $1.6 billion to $12.5 billion. By 1999, Israel ranked second only to the United States in invested private-equity capital as a share of GDP. And it led the world in the share of its growth attributable to high-tech ventures: 70 percent.

Israel's thriving venture capital industry has played an important role in financing and funding Silicon Wadi. The financial crisis of 2007–08 affected the availability of venture capital locally. In 2009, there were 63 mergers and acquisitions in the Israeli market worth a total of $2.54 billion; 7% below 2008 levels ($2.74 billion), when 82 Israeli companies were merged or acquired, and 33% lower than 2007 proceeds ($3.79 billion) when 87 Israeli companies were merged or acquired. Numerous high tech Israeli companies have been acquired by global corporations for its provision of reliable and quality corporate personnel. The March acquisition of Israeli company Mellanox for $6.9 billion by Nvidia Corporation is a definite contender for the largest M&A deal in 2019. Generally, Israeli startups are becoming so attractive that U.S. companies tend to acquire them more than anyone else: they account for half of all transactions in 2018. Thus, Israels eventually became a "net seller".

Israel's venture capital industry has about 70 active venture capital funds, of which 14 international VCs with Israeli offices. Additionally, there are some 220 international funds, including Polaris Venture Partners, Accel Partners and Greylock Partners, that do not have branches in Israel, but actively invest in Israel through an in-house specialist.

In 2009, the life sciences sector led the market with $272 million or 24% of total capital raised, followed by the software sector with $258 million or 23%, the communications sector with $219 million or 20%, and the Internet sector with 13% of capital raised in 2009.

Multinational technology companies operating in Israel

As of 2010, more than 35,000 personnel were employed in multinationals research and development centers across Israel. In recent years, East Asian multinationals and investors, especially from Mainland China, have actively invested and opened up offices in Israel, including Chinese technology giants such as Alibaba, Baidu, Tencent and Kuang-Chi. Around 60 foreign R&D centers are engaged in a diverse range of activities including biotechnology, chemicals, industrial machinery, communication equipment, scientific instruments, medical devices, flash memory storage equipment, computer hardware components, software, semiconductors and internet.

See also
Download Valley
Economy of Israel
List of Israeli companies quoted on the Nasdaq
List of multinationals with research and development centres in Israel
List of technology centers
Made in JLM
Science and technology in Israel
Start-up Nation: The Story of Israel's Economic Miracle
Startup Village, Yokneam

References

External links

Israel’s Silicon Wadi: The forces behind cluster formation — by Catherine de Fontenay and Erran Carmel, June 2002
High-Tech Opportunities in Israel — Israel Ministry of Foreign Affairs, May 2002
Wireless Valley, Silicon Wadi and Digital Island – Helsinki, Tel Aviv and Dublin and the ICT global production network — by Stephen Roper and Seamus Grimes, March 2005. (Subsequently, published in Geoforum)
Entrepreneurship Models of the Countries that Leverage Silicon Valley  by Mustafa Ergen
American University: Israel: ICT Geographics
VC Cafe — A blog by Eze Vidra, dedicated to covering Israeli startups and venture capital investments in the Silicon Wadi

Economy of Israel
Silicon Wadi, Israel
Information technology places
Regions of Israel
Science and technology in Israel